Li Rihua (1565–1635) was a Chinese bureaucrat, artist and art critic from Jiaxing, during the late Ming Dynasty. He wrote an extensive diary, the Weishuixuan riji (Water-Tasting Gallery Diary), from 1609 to 1616, which detailed his many acquisitions as an art collector. The diary is so named because Li had a reputation as a connoisseur of tea, and was particularly skilled at selecting the best water with which to brew it. For a time, he was married to the courtesan Xue Susu, and wrote colophons for several of her paintings.

References

Chinese art critics
Ming dynasty essayists
Chinese diarists
1565 births
1635 deaths